The Welcome Stranger is the biggest alluvial gold nugget that has ever been found, which had a calculated refined weight of . It measured  and was discovered by prospectors John Deason and Richard Oates on 5 February 1869 at Moliagul, Victoria, Australia, about 14.6 kilometres (9 miles) north-west of Dunolly.

Discovery

At the time of the discovery, there were no scales capable of weighing a nugget this large, so it was broken into three pieces on an anvil by Dunolly-based blacksmith Archibald Walls.

Deason, Oates, and a few friends took the nugget to the London Chartered Bank of Australia, in Dunolly, which advanced them £9,000. Deason and Oates were finally paid an estimated £9,381 for their nugget, which became known as the "Welcome Stranger". At August 2019 gold prices, it would be worth US$3.4 million [2.3 million GBP]. It was heavier than the "Welcome Nugget" of  that had been found in Ballarat in 1858. The goldfields warden F. K. Orme reported that  of smelted gold had been obtained from it, irrespective of scraps that were given away by the finders, estimated as totalling another .

The nugget was soon melted down and the gold was sent as ingots to Melbourne for forwarding to the Bank of England. It left the country on board the steamship Reigate which departed on 21 February.

An obelisk commemorating the discovery of the "Welcome Stranger" was erected near the spot in 1897. A replica of the "Welcome Stranger" is in the Old Treasury building, Treasury Place, Melbourne, Victoria; another replica is owned by descendants of John Deason and is now on display at the Dunolly Rural Transaction Center.

Discoverers
In 1851, he was a tin dresser before becoming a gold miner. Deason continued with gold mining and workings most of his life and, although he became a store keeper at Moliagul, he lost a substantial proportion of his wealth through poor investments in gold mining. He bought a small farm near Moliagul where he lived until he died in 1915, aged 85 years.

Richard Oates was born about 1827 at Pendeen in Cornwall. After the 1869 find, Oates returned to the UK and married. He returned to Australia with his wife and they had four children.

Descendants of the two discoverers gathered to celebrate the 150th anniversary of the discovery of the nugget.

See also
List of gold nuggets by size

References

Further reading

 Deason, Denise (2005). Welcome, stranger: The amazing true story of one man's legendary search for gold – at all costs. Melbourne: Viking / Penguin Books. .

 

Gold nuggets
Australian gold rushes
Mining in Victoria (Australia)
History of Victoria (Australia)
History of Australia (1851–1900)
1869 in Australia
Mining in Cornwall